The 2016 French F4 Championship season was the 24th season of the series for 1600cc Formula Renault machinery, and the sixth season to run under the guise of the French F4 Championship. The series began on 1 April at Le Castellet and ended on 6 November at Montmeló, after six rounds and twenty-four races.

Driver lineup

Driver Changes

Graduating from French F4 
 Giuliano Alesi, son of former F1 driver Jean Alesi, was signed by the Ferrari Driver Academy and promoted to GP3 with Trident. 
 Sacha Fenestraz and Gabriel Aubrey were promoted to the Formula Renault 2.0 championship with Tech 1 Racing. 
 Simo Laaksonen will compete in Germany's ADAC F4 after running French F4 and SMP F4 campaigns in 2015.
 Alternatively Nerses Isaakyan, Nikita Troitskiy and Aleksey Korneev will move to Formula Renault 2.0 for 2016 after partial French F4 seasons.
 Axel Matus returned to his home country to participate in the inaugural NACAM F4 championship.
 Louis Gachot, son of former F1 driver Bertrand Gachot, switched to ADAC F4 for 2016.

Race calendar and results

A six-round calendar was published in December 2015. This was however revised in January 2016, with now four races per round being held, as opposed to the triple-header rounds that were run on previous years.

Race format
 Race 1 grid will be set by second fastest qualifying lap.
 Race 2 will be an inversion of the top 10 from race 1.
 Race 3 grid will be set by fastest qualifying lap. 
 Race 4 will be set by the finishing order of race 3.

Championship standings

Points system

Points are awarded as follows:

French F4 Championship

References

External links
 The official website of the French F4 Championship 

F4 Championship
French F4